Ribes binominatum is a species of currant known by the common names trailing gooseberry and ground gooseberry.

It is native to the Klamath Mountains and adjacent northern California Coast Ranges, in far northern California and western Oregon. It grows in higher-elevation forests and meadows.

Description
Ribes binominatum  is a low, spreading shrub no more than a meter (40 inches) tall, and often quite a bit shorter. Nodes along the stem each bear three spines up to 2 centimeters in length. The hairy, glandular leaves are 2 to 5 centimeters (0.8-2.0 inch) long and deeply divided into 3 or 5 rounded, toothed lobes.

The inflorescence is a solitary flower or a raceme of up to four flowers which dangling from the branches. The flower has five fuzzy sepals in shades of pale green, sometimes edged with red, which are reflexed upward. At the center is a tubular corolla of white or pinkish petals around five stamens and two shorter styles.

The fruit is a yellowish green berry about a centimeter (0.4 inch) wide which is covered in long prickles which harden into spines.

References

External links
Jepson Manual Treatment — Ribes binominatum
United States Department of Agriculture Plants Profile

binominatum
Flora of California
Flora of Oregon
Flora of the Klamath Mountains
Endemic flora of the United States
Natural history of the California Coast Ranges
Taxa named by Amos Arthur Heller
Plants described in 1898